Rochelle is a given name for women.

Notable people bearing this name include:

Rochelle Abramson, American violinist
Rochelle Alers (born 1963), American writer
Rochelle Aytes (born 1976), American actress
Rochelle Ballard (born 1971), American surfer
Rochelle Buffenstein, senior principal investigator
Rochelle Feinstein (born 1947), American visual artist
Rochelle Gadd (born 1980), British actress
Rochelle Gilmore (born 1981), Australian racing cyclist
Rochelle Gutierrez, American professor of education
Rochelle Hudson (1916-1972), American actress
Rochelle Humes (born 1989), British singer
Rochelle Huppin, American chef
Rochelle Jones (1945–2006), American journalist
Rochelle Majer Krich (born 1947), German writer
Rochelle Lazarus (born 1947), American businesswoman
Rochelle Lefkowitz, American activist
Rochelle Lieber, American professor of English
Rochelle Loewen (born 1979), American model
Rochelle Low (born 1969), Canadian field hockey player
Rochelle Oliver (born 1937), American actress
Rochelle Owens (born 1936), American poet and playwright
Rochelle Pangilinan (born 1982) Filipina artist
Rochelle Perts (born 1992), Dutch singer
Rochelle Potkar (born 1979), Indian fiction writer
Rochelle Rao (born 1988), Indian model and actress
Rochelle Riley, Director of Arts and Culture for the City of Detroit
Rochelle Stevens (born 1966), Olympic gold medalist
Rochelle Watson, Australian singer
Rochelle Walensky, American medical scientist

References

Feminine given names